Jupiter Coyote is an American rock band from Macon, Georgia. Operating as an independent group from the late 1980s into the 2020s, they have sold more than one million records.

History
Bandmembers Matthew Mayes and John Felty were childhood friends in Brevard, North Carolina, and put the group together after completing undergraduate studies and moving to Macon, Georgia. The group was initially a cover band known as the Rockafellas and released its first album of original material as Jupiter Coyote in 1991, incorporating southern rock, bluegrass, funk, and country into their sound and touring the jam band circuit. The group refers to its music as "mountain rock" and features the guijo, a guitar-banjo hybrid invented by Matthew Mayes. Two members left the group and were replaced in 1991. The group's own label, Autonomous, released albums such as Wade (1994), Lucky Day (1995), and Here Be Dragons (1998). Autonomous had a distribution deal with Roadrunner Records and helped launch the careers of Strangefolk and Sister Hazel. With Steve Trismen's addition in 1999 the group added fiddle to its sound, and in the 2000s they expanded to a septet when guitarist John Meyer and drummer Noel Felty came on board.

The group remained active as a touring ensemble in the 2010s and 2020s in addition to recording. Performances included repeated concerts at the Windjammer in Isle of Palms, South Carolina, a 2018 show at the Songbirds Guitar Museum in Chattanooga, and a 2021 headlining performance at the Oakland Cemetery in Atlanta.

Members

Current
Matthew Mayes - guitar, guijo, vocals
John Meyer - guitar
Gene Bass - drums (1992-2000, ?-present)
Noel Felty - drums (2000-present)
Sanders Brightwell - bass (1992-present)
Steve Trismen - fiddle, vocals (1999-present)
Kevin "Ponchito" Scheyer - percussion
Robert Soto - percussion

Former
John Felty - vocals, guitar
Ned Grubb (c. 1988-1992)
Matt Trevitt (c. 1988-1992)
David Stevens Jr. - percussion (1993-1997)

Discography
Cemeteries and Junkyards (Stolen Records, 1991)
Wade (Autonomous Records, 1993)
Lucky Day (Autonomous/Roadrunner, 1995)
Ghost Dance (Autonomous, 1997)
Here Be Dragons (Autonomous/Roadrunner, 1998)
Live (Coyote Recordings, 2000)
Waxing Moon (Coyote Recordings, 2001)
The Hillary Step (Coyote Recordings, 2004)
Sage with Toad (MBM Records, 2011)
Life Got in the Way (Self-released, 2018)
The Interplanetary Yard Dog (Self-released, 2020)

References

Rock music groups from Georgia (U.S. state)
Jam bands